Borneo SubOrbitals is a public-private spaceflight venture. Created in 2019, it is involving several tertiary institutions and a local social enterprise, which comprises Universiti Malaysia Sarawak (UNIMAS), University of Malaya (UM) and Universiti Teknologi Petronas (UTP), with collaboration of The Learning Curve, The Hills Lifestyle Community Lifestyle Hub and Strand Aerospace Malaysia.

Overview 
Each party will be responsible for rocket research, design, assembly and launch. UTP will be handling with simulations and electronics design, while UM will be handling static and dynamic structural analysis and rocket material selection and UNIMAS will manufacture and assemble the rocket, with supervision and consultancy of Strand Aerospace Malaysia.

They also have interest in mind to increase local students' interest in Science, Technology, Engineering and Mathematics (STEM).

Hybrid rocket suborbital project 
Sometime in 2021/2022, they will launch a hybrid-fueled suborbital rocket. While rocket design and name are not officially revealed yet, based on rocket mock-up, it is a 2-3 stage design with black and greyish colour scheme. The rocket will be capable of reaching an altitude of 55 km and will be equipped with sensors and telemetry devices that will travel on a sub-orbital path while sending back valuable visuals, atmospheric and ocean data, and climate change information for researchers and MOSTI, before landing back in the ocean. The rocket will be launched in Kuching, Sarawak, and marks as the second rocket launch from Borneo island (the first rocket launch from Borneo is 'Low Level Satellite Project' flight test sounding rocket by an unaffiliated teenager in October 2018, reached 5 km in altitude). The rocket will also be gradually contributed to by students through Blast Off One event.

Blast off one event 
The event was first inaugurated on 29–30 June 2019 at 11Ridgeway. The event, which is held yearly, is a collaboration between Borneo SubOrbitals, Planetarium Sultan Iskandar, Ministry of Science, Technology and Innovation (MOSTI) and The Learning Curve. The event consisted of stargazing, 3D modelling and printing, rocket fuel design workshop and competition, rocket science lecture and planet observation. Through this event, students can learn, contribute and shape the future design of the team's suborbital rocket, including its solid fuel and oxidizer propellant choice.

See also
Independence-X Aerospace
Astronautic Technology Sdn Bhd (ATSB)

References

External links 
 Borneo SubOrbitals Facebook

Private spaceflight companies
Rocket engine manufacturers of Malaysia
2019 establishments in Malaysia
Aerospace companies of Malaysia
Technology companies established in 2019
Aircraft engineering companies